Bart Jason Moore-Gilbert (8 December 1952 – 2 December 2015) was a Tanzanian-born, British academic, orientalist and political campaigner, most widely known for his work in the field of postcolonial literary studies and theory.

Education
Moore-Gilbert graduated from Durham University (Grey College) in 1975 with a first-class degree in English Language and Literature.

Career
His work has been translated into fifteen languages. Moore-Gilbert taught at Goldsmiths College, University of London, a position he held from 1998. His final academic study, the first critical assessment of postcolonial life-writing in English, was published by Routledge in June 2009.

In 2014, Verso published Moore-Gilbert's memoir, The Setting Sun: A Memoir of Empire and Family Secrets, a highly acclaimed account of his travels in India undertaken to shed light on his father's alleged role in acts of British colonial brutality. The book, which combined elements of travel writing, historical research and personal memoir, received positive reviews in The Guardian, Hürriyet Daily News, and Times Educational Supplement and was shortlisted for the PEN Ackerley Prize.

Moore-Gilbert died in Trinity Hospice on 2 December 2015 after a battle with kidney cancer. During his illness, he kept a blog tracing the development of his cancer and his treatment.

Selected publications
Cultural Closure? The Challenge of the Arts in the 1970s (1994) 
Cultural Revolution? The Challenge of the Arts in the 1960s (1992) 
Postcolonial Theory: Contexts, Practices, Politics (1997) 
Post Colonial Criticism (Longman Critical Reader) (ed) (1997) 
Writing India (ed), 1757-1990: Literature of British India (1996) 
Kipling and Orientalism (1986) 
Hanif Kureishi (2001) 
Postcolonial Life-Writing: Culture, Politics, and Self-Representation (2009) 
The Setting Sun: A Memoir of Empire and Family Secrets (2014)

References

External links
Voices of victimhood, review of Post-Colonial Theory in the Times Higher Education Supplement, accessed 2008-11-28

Alumni of Grey College, Durham
Academics of Goldsmiths, University of London
Postcolonial literature
English orientalists
1952 births
2015 deaths